Barry Watson is the former president and CEO of Illumitoon Entertainment. He was formerly a producer and voice director for FUNimation Entertainment whose production credits include:

 Bakuretsu Tenshi - Tenshi Sairin (OAV)
 Blue Gender (TV series and feature-length movie)
 Burst Angel (TV series)
 Case Closed (TV series)
 Dragon Ball (TV series and feature-length movies)
 Dragonball GT (TV series, including A Hero's Legacy, a special episode)
 Dragonball Z (TV series and feature-length movies)
 Fruits Basket (TV series)
 Fullmetal Alchemist (TV series)
 Gunslinger Girl (TV series)
 Kiddy Grade (TV series)
 Kodocha (TV series)
 Lupin III (Special episodes and feature-length movies)
 Sakura Taisen: Sumire (OAV)
 Spiral (TV series)
 Tenchi Muyo! GXP (TV series)
 YuYu Hakusho (TV series)

Daniel Cocanougher, FUNimation's Vice President, was listed on production credits with Watson on many projects. Following Illumitoon's founding in 2006, Justin Cook and Carly Hunter have been credited as producer on FUNimation's titles. He also did the English voice of Dr. Brief's cat, Scratch in the English dub of Dragon Ball and its sequel, Dragon Ball Z.

References

Living people
Place of birth missing (living people)
Year of birth missing (living people)
American film producers
American television producers
American male voice actors
American business executives
American television executives
American voice directors